The Wirdinja  were an Aboriginal Australian people of Western Australia.

Country
Their eastern frontier, which is not precisely defined, lay in the area of Savoury Creek. Mundiwindi, Jigalong, Murramunda, and Sylvania all formed part of their territory. Their southern limits ran down to the headwaters of the Ashburton and Ethel rivers.

Alternative names
 Jabura ('north')
 Mardo ('initiated man.' i.e., people who practiced both circumcision and subincision
 Wirdinja
 Woordinya

Source:

Notes

Citations

Sources

Aboriginal peoples of Western Australia